Sing in My Meadow is an album by the Canadian alt-country band Cowboy Junkies, released in 2011. It is Volume Three of the Nomad Series. The album was recorded at The Clubhouse in Toronto, Ontario. This volume of the Nomad Series brings the band's live shows into the studio, employing their touring musicians as the only recording musicians for the sessions.

Development 
The album was recorded in four days, showcasing the free-wheeling energy of the band's live concerts.

Track listing

Personnel 
Cowboy Junkies
Margo Timmins – lead vocals
Michael Timmins – guitar
Alan Anton – bass
Peter Timmins – drums

Additional musician
Jeff Bird – harmonica, electric mandolin

Production
Michael Timmins – producer, engineer, mixed by
Peter Moore – mastered at the E Room
Alice Phieu – graphics design
Enrique Martinez Celaya – cover images

References 

2011 albums
Cowboy Junkies albums
Latent Recordings albums